The Christian Conservative Social Union (KKSS) was a centre-right, Christian-conservative political party in Lithuania.

History
The party was established as the Union of Moderate Conservatives (Nuosaikiųjų konservatorių sąjunga) in 2000 as a breakaway from the Homeland Union. Initially led by former Prime Minister Gediminas Vagnorius, it contested the 2000 elections, receiving 2% of the vote and winning a single seat.

By the 2004 elections the party had been renamed the "Christian Conservative Social Union". It received again 2.0% of the vote, but lost its single seat in the Seimas.

On 23 January 2010 it merged into the Christian Party.

References

External links
Official website

Catholic political parties
Conservative parties in Lithuania
Defunct political parties in Lithuania
2000 establishments in Lithuania
Political parties established in 2000
Political parties disestablished in 2010
Defunct Christian political parties